Racial groups in South Africa have a variety of origins. The racial categories introduced by Apartheid remain ingrained in South African society with South Africans and the governing party of South Africa continuing to classify themselves, and each other, as belonging to one of the four defined race groups (Blacks, Whites, Coloureds and Indians). Statistics South Africa asks people to describe themselves in the census in terms of five racial population groups. The 2019 mid-year population estimates were Black South African at 80.7%, White South African at 7.9%, Coloured South African at 8.8%, and Indian South African at 2.6%.

Statistics South Africa provided five racial categories by which people could classify themselves, the last of which, "unspecified/other" drew negligible responses, and these results were omitted. The 2010 midyear estimated figures for the other categories were Black at 78.4%, White at 10.2%, Coloured at 8.8%, Indian/Asian at 2.6%. The first census in South Africa in 1911 showed that Whites made up 22% of the population; it declined to 16% in 1980.

Black South Africans

The majority population of South Africa are those that classify themselves Black or indigenous South Africans, Africans or Black people of South Africa, but they are not culturally or linguistically homogeneous. The major ethnic parts of the group are the Zulu, Xhosa, Bapedi (North Sotho), Batswana, South Ndebele, Basotho (South Sotho), Venda, Tsonga and Swazi, all of which predominantly speak Southern Bantu languages.

Black South African ethnicity's native distribution is also found across countries neighbouring South Africa. The Basotho are the majority ethnic group of Lesotho. The Tswana ethnic group constitute the majority of the population of Botswana. The Swazi ethnic group is the majority ethnic group in Swaziland. The Tsonga ethnic group is also found in Southern Mozambique; they are also known as the Shangaan (Shangana, Shangane or Shangani).

African

African may refer to black South Africans who call themselves indigenous South Africans. It is also used to refer to Black people from other African countries who are in South Africa.

African can also be used to describe Afrikaners.

The Khoisan of South Africa are the minority of indigenous South Africans that complete the context indigenous or the Black South African population. It is important to note that some Coloureds are now identifying themselves as Khoisan because of their mixed heritage that includes the latter, though they also draw ancestry from the Bantu South Africans and the Dutch people.

Demographics
As of the calculations of 2004, there are 34,216,164  Blacks and 8,625,050  Black households residing in South Africa. The Black population density is 29/km2. The density of  Black households is 7/km2. Blacks made up 79.0% of the total population in 2011 and 81% in 2016. The percentage of all Black households that are made up of individuals is 19.9%. The average Black household size is 4.11 members.

In South Africa, the Black population is spread out, with 34.0% under the age of 15, 21.6% from 15 to 24, 28.3% from 25 to 44, 11.8% from 45 to 64 and 4.3% who are 65 years of age or older. The median age of a Black South African is 21 years. For every 100  Black females there are 91.1 Black males. For every 100  Black females age 18 and over, there are 86.2 Black males.

With regard to education, 22.3% of  Blacks aged 20 and over have received no schooling, 18.5% have had some primary, 6.9% have completed only primary school, 30.4% have had some high education, 16.8% have finished only high school and 5.2% have an education higher than the high school level. Overall, 22.0% of  Blacks have completed high school and 59% of Blacks, aged 25 to 64, have an upper secondary education as their highest level of education. This places South Africa above the G20 average of 32% and the OECD average of 38%.

The percentage of  Black housing units having a telephone and/or mobile phone in the dwelling is 31.1%. The percentage having access to a nearby phone is 57.2%, and 11.7% do not have nearby access or any access. The percentage of  Black households that have a flush or chemical toilet is 41.9%. Refuse is removed from 45.3% of  Black households by the municipality at least once a week and 11.0% have no rubbish disposal. Some 17.9% of Africans have running water inside their dwelling, 51.7% have running water on their property and 80.2% have access to running water. The percentage of  Black households using electricity for cooking is 39.3%, for heating, 37.2% and for lighting, 62.0%. Radios are owned by 68.7% of  Black households while 44.2% have a television, 1.8% own a computer, 40.0% have a refrigerator and 24.6% have a mobile phone.

The unemployment rate of the  Black population aged 15–65 is 28.1%. The median annual income of  Black working adults aged 15–65 is ZAR 12,073.  Black males have a median annual income of ZAR 14,162 versus ZAR 8,903 for  Black females.

Coloured South Africans

The Coloured population is mainly concentrated in the Cape region, and come from a combination of ethnic backgrounds including Indigenous South Africans, Whites, Griqua and Asians.

It is important to denote that this ethnicity is not by default to people of multiracial heritage in South Africa, therefore many multiracial South Africans do identify by any ethnic heritage they may be from i.e. Blacks, Whites, Asians etc., in the same matter, some people with little or no multiracial heritage do identify as a Coloured ethnic. However, during Apartheid this ethnicity was by law anyone who is of multiracial heritage or determined to be Coloured by the government. This ethnicity doesn't necessarily have an ethnic language nor of specific race but they are contemporarily South African cultured and rather stem their traditional and historical identity from the sense of community of Coloured people, e.g. Cape Coloureds. They are not all culturally or linguistically homogeneous but many from those who identify as Coloured usually speak Afrikaans as a first language.

In detail, Coloureds descend from indigenous African people (South African Bantu-speaking peoples, South African Khoisan (mostly those who lived in the Cape Peninsula) and Africans not of South African descent), Griqua multiracials, European groups (mainly Dutch and British) and Asian groups (Javanese, Malay, Indian, Malagasy and other concerned Asian ethnicities) mainly of slaves brought in South Africa. The Cape Malay (or Cape Muslim) identity, which was classified as a subgroup of Coloured by the apartheid government, was generally held to encompass people of multiracial heritage from the Cape, who practiced Islam.

Khoisan refers to two separate groups. The Khoikhoi, who were called Hottentots by the Europeans, were pastoralists and extensively integrated into the colonial economy, many converting early to Christianity; the San people, called Bushmen by the Europeans, were hunter-gatherers. The Khoisan groups as a minority completes the rest of the indigenous South African population and it is also found that others do not classify themselves as Black South African, African or even Black African. In the 2011 census for example, the overwhelming majority of the San community in Platfontein originating from the northern parts of Namibia and southern Angola opted to be classified as 'Other' and many from those claiming to be descendants of Namaqualand Khoikhoi classify themselves as Coloured.

Within the Coloured community, more recent immigrants will also be found i.e. Coloureds from the former Rhodesia (now Zimbabwe); Namibia and immigrants of mixed descent from India (such as Anglo-Indians) who were welcomed to the Cape when India and Burma received their Independence.

In 2008, the Pretoria High Court ruled that the descendents of mainland Chinese who arrived before 1994, and had been classified as a subgroup of Coloured by the apartheid government, were eligible for redress. As a result of this ruling, about 12,000–15,000 ethnically Chinese citizens who arrived before 1994, numbering 3%–5% of the total Chinese population in the country, will be able to benefit from government BEE policies.

White South Africans

White Africans (also known as "Afrikaners" or "English South Africans") in South Africa are predominantly descendants of Dutch, German, French Huguenot, English, Portuguese and other European settlers. Culturally and linguistically, they are divided into Afrikaners, who speak Afrikaans, and English-speaking groups. The White population decreased in the 1990s and 2000s due to a low birth rate and emigration. As factor in their decision to emigrate, many cite the high crime rate, affirmative action policies and racial discrimination. From 1994 to 2010, approximately 400,000 Whites permanently emigrated. Despite high emigration levels, immigrants from Europe have settled in the country. By 2005, an estimated 212,000 British citizens were residing in South Africa. By 2011, this number may have grown to 500,000. Some European Zimbabweans emigrated to South Africa. Some of the more nostalgic members of the community are known in popular culture as "Whenwes", because of their nostalgia for their lives in Rhodesia "when we were in Rhodesia". White South Africans also returned in large numbers in the 2000s and 2010s. In May 2014, Homecoming Revolution estimated that around 340,000 White South Africans had returned to South Africa in the preceding decade.

There have been other White immigration waves to South Africa in recent decades. In the 1970s, many Portuguese residents of African colonies such as Angola and Mozambique moved to South Africa after the independence of those nations. In addition, the apartheid government encouraged Central European immigration in the 1980s and early 1990s, particularly from Poland and Hungary. In the Near East, particularly from Turkey, Azerbaijan, and Armenia.

Demographics
As of the census of 2001, there are 4,293,638 Whites and 1,409,690 White households residing in South Africa. The White population density is 4/km2. The density of White households is 1.16/km2. Whites made up 9.6% of the total population.

The percentage of all White households that are made up of individuals is 19.1%. The average White household size is 3.05 members. In South Africa, the White population is spread out, with 19.0% under the age of 15, 15.1% from 15 to 24, 31.0% from 25 to 44, 23.8% from 45 to 64, and 11.1% who are 65 years of age or older. The median age of a White is 35 years. For every 100 White females there are 94.0 White males. For every 100 White females age 18 and over, there are 91.1 White males.

With regards to education, 1.4% of Whites aged 20 and over have received no schooling, 1.2% have had no more than some primary school education, 0.8% have only completed primary school, 25.9% have had no more than some high school education, 41.3% have finished only high school, and 29.8% have an education higher than the high-school level. Overall, 70.7% of Whites have completed high school.

The percentage of White housing units having a telephone and/or mobile phone in the dwelling is 95.4%. The percentage having access to a nearby phone is 4.4%, and 0.2% do not have nearby access or any access. The percentage of White households that have a flush or chemical toilet is 98.7%. Refuse is removed from 90.8% of White households by the municipality at least once a week, and 0.5% have no rubbish disposal. Some 87.2% of White have running water inside their dwelling, 95.6% have running water on their property, and 99.4% have access to running water. The percentage of White households using electricity for cooking is 96.6%, for heating, 93.2%, and for lighting, 99.2%. Radios are owned by 94.7% of White households while 92.6% have a television, 46.0% own a computer, 97.6% have a refrigerator, and 74.6% have a mobile phone.

The unemployment rate of the White population aged 15–65 is 4.1%. The median annual income of White working adults aged 15–65 is ZAR 65,000. White males have a median annual income of ZAR 81,701 versus ZAR 52,392 for White females.

Indian South Africans

 
Descendants of migrants from British India in the late 19th and early 20th century have an estimated population of 1.2 million or 2.5% of the South African population; many of them descended from indentured workers brought in the nineteenth century to work on the sugar plantations of the eastern coastal area of Natal and adhered to different religions and spoke different languages. A smaller number, called Passenger Indians came independently for work purposes and business interests at around the same time. Indians (synonymous with Asian) are regarded as one of South Africa's 4 race groups.

Chinese South Africans
There is also a significant group of Chinese South Africans (approximately over 300,000 individuals). They were classified as a subgroup of Coloured, or as honorary white during apartheid.

Smaller groups
There is a small but notable population of Lemba people who live primarily in the north eastern regions of South Africa who have Bantu and Semitic origins.

Zimbabweans, Somalis, Pakistanis and Nigerians are large migrant communities. There are also Vietnamese South Africans, Japanese, and Koreans in South Africa.

A small population of Kalderash Roma live in South Africa.

Population growth
Between 2009 and 2016, South Africa's population increased by 11.6% from an estimated 49.9 million to an estimated 55.7 million.

References